Tellico Dam is a dam on the Little Tennessee River that was built by the Tennessee Valley Authority (TVA) in Loudon County, Tennessee. Planning for a dam structure on the Little Tennessee was reported as early as 1936 but was deferred for development until 1942. Unlike the agency's previous dams built for hydroelectric power and flood control, the Tellico Dam was primarily constructed as an economic development and tourism initiative through the planned city concept of Timberlake. The development project aimed to support a population of 42,000 in a rural region in poor economic conditions. Completed in 1979, it created the Tellico Reservoir and is the last dam to be built by the Tennessee Valley Authority.

Tellico Dam is the subject of several controversies regarding the need of its construction and the impacts the structure had on the surrounding environment. Inundation of the Little Tennessee required the acquisition of thousands of acres, predominantly multi-generational farmland and historic sites including the Fort Loudoun settlement, and several Cherokee tribal villages including the village of Tanasi, the basis of the name for the state of Tennessee. Most of the acreage around the final lakeshore, originally seized through eminent domain, was given to private developers to create retirement-oriented resort communities such as Tellico Village and Rarity Bay. 

The Tellico Dam project was also controversial because of the risk it was believed to pose to the endangered snail darter fish species. Environmentalist groups took the TVA to court as a means to halt the project and protect the snail darter. The court action delayed the final completion of the dam for over two years. In the 1978 case Tennessee Valley Authority v. Hill heard by the Supreme Court of the United States, the court ruled in favor of the environmental groups and declared that the completion of Tellico Dam was illegal. However, the dam was completed and filling of the reservoir commenced in November 1979, after the project was exempted from the Endangered Species Act with the passing of the 1980 public works appropriations bill by the United States Congress and President Jimmy Carter.

Background

Preliminary planning and Timberlake initiative
The Tennessee Valley Authority (TVA) was formally established in 1933 as part of programs under the New Deal. The agency was initially tasked with modernizing the region, using experts and electricity to combat human and economic problems.

In 1936, the TVA began studies for hydroelectric dam sites. Early TVA plans suggested the construction of a dam along the Little Tennessee River at its mouth at the Tennessee River adjacent to Bussell Island. This later became known as the Fort Loudoun Extension, an expansion of the adjacent Fort Loudoun Dam. However, the project was canceled on October 20, 1942 because of a lack of federal funding resulting from wartime issues.

In 1959, TVA chairman Red Wagner approved the restart of project development on the Fort Loudoun Extension, now named the Tellico Project. The justification for the project was to improve the economic conditions of the Little Tennessee watershed, through land and recreational development. This project, which encompassed acreage in Loudon, Blount, and Monroe counties, became known as the City of Timberlake Plan, named for journalist Henry Timberlake who explored the Cherokee villages that once occupied the area. Timberlake, the TVA's ambitious attempt at creating a city from scratch, aimed at providing a high-quality and self-sufficient city supporting an estimated population of 42,000. The project was promoted as a nationwide demonstration of land use initiatives and economic development for the poor rural area of the Little Tennessee Valley, to transform it into a thriving economic urban center. The Tellico Dam component of the Timberlake initiative was planned to provide a large-size reservoir for water sports for recreation purposes and for freight transport via barge for proposed industrial sites that would get access to the Tennessee River through a canal. Despite no plans for generating electricity at the Tellico Dam site, the canal that was part of the project enabled an extra 23 MW of power generation capacity by diverting the flow of the Little Tennessee upstream of Fort Loudoun Dam. The Timberlake project obtained support with the announcement of major investment from the Boeing Corporation along with Congressional aid. In 1974, the Tennessee state legislature unsuccessfully proposed a bill seeking to incorporate the Timberlake area into a city. The plans for the City of Timberlake never fully materialized and were discontinued in 1975 following pullout from Boeing, who cited the project as not economically feasible.

Property acquisition and eminent domain

For the remaining area, TVA allocated  for residential, recreational, and industrial development as part of the proposed Timberlake planned city project. The remaining land served as buffer zones between development areas and the reservoir. When the TVA began to approach property owners in the Lower Tennessee Valley for the development of Tellico Dam, several communities that TVA sought to "modernize" through this project were at the time in touch with most of the modern Appalachian society that TVA had contributed to since the 1930s. Members of the river shed communities least impacted by modernization reacted most positively to TVA's plans, compared with the more modern communities. Historians of the project have suggested that most TVA personnel did not understand the complexity of the communities that they were intruding into with the Tellico project, leading to more heated opposition.

The Tellico Project was revealed to the public as early as 1960, with reactions similar to previous TVA projects. Public meetings commenced throughout the Little Tennessee Valley in the mid-1960s at civic spaces in Loudon, Blount, and Monroe counties to address concerns raised by citizens about the Tellico and Timberlake projects. At the time, TVA officials did not expect that the Tellico Project would be met with anything more than token opposition. In 1963, small clusters of Little Tennessee Valley landowners and businesspeople formed a community group known as the Fort Loudoun Association opposing the Tellico project. Extensive local opposition emerged at a public forum on September 22, 1964, at Greenback High School in the town of Greenback, located on the proposed eastern shore of the Tellico reservoir. Four hundred residents attended with over 90% reporting strong opposition. Attendees grew hostile, perceiving the Tellico project as an intrusion. One month after the contentious meeting at Greenback High School, anti-Tellico individuals formed a larger opposition group, the Association for the Preservation of the Little Tennessee River. This move showed that project opposition was not one that "would easily buckle and roll over before the mighty presence of the Tennessee Valley Authority".  

The acquisition phase of the project required the usage of eminent domain, a statutory right granted to TVA at its establishment by Congress in 1933. This legal authority allowed TVA to take ownership of private property for uses the TVA deemed to be for public benefit. Many property owners concerned about seizure of land reported that TVA personnel provided "taking lines" about the extent of private land acquisition that was planned. Many viewed these actions as TVA overreaching their authority, provoking more public opposition to the project. Unlike with TVA's early hydroelectric projects, the documentation of residents relocated was based on poorly executed efforts. TVA officials had never documented an exact number of how many families were to be affected, even after the property acquisition process had started in 1963. Initial estimates suggested the removal of 600 families, whereas the actual number was closer to 350 families. No documentation has been made down to the individuals all of the 350 families removed. Most of the families mandated to move complied, but three unwilling property owners were evicted by U.S. Marshals and watched their houses being demolished as they were evicted. In regards to the Tellico project's impact on the area's farming industry, 330 farms along the Little Tennessee River were lost following its inundation. In total, $25.5 million was spent by the TVA for land acquisition.

Construction and engineering

Construction on the Tellico Project began on March 7, 1967, with clearing work for the main dam structure. Work on the concrete structure of the dam was complete by October of the next year. Other portions of the dam constructed with earth fill were complete by August 1975, with the river flow from the original Little Tennessee soon forced via pump through the completed sluice gates of the main concrete dam. Around this time, work on coffer dams to assist with the main dam were complete. By the time of the forced closure of construction, work on the Tellico Project was nearly 90% complete, aside from final land clearing, recreational facility preparation, and a highway system that was nearly finished. 

In total, $63 million was endowed for the construction of the concrete dam and spillway, the main earth dam, coffer dams, roadway and railroad facilities, reservoir clearing, utility relocations, access roads, a canal with access to the Tennessee River, public use facilities, and general yard improvements. Most of this funding was used for the dam, over 65 miles of state, county, and local access roads, and three large-scale bridge replacement projects. The TVA also invested another $3.6 million for two major road projects scheduled for initial work starting after the completion and opening of the Tellico Dam structure. Officials with the Tennessee Department of Transportation expressed doubt about the completion of the Tellico Parkway (State Route 444), one of these major road projects. The TVA received nearly $665,000 in revenue as the project was underway. Timber cleared for the project provided $99,000 and farmland and housing seized by the agency was leased with a revenue close to $566,000. Labor costs for the project totaled $24.7 million, with most of this associated with the construction of the main Tellico Dam structure. Engineering, planning, and administrative services for the project cost $14.7 million.

Environmental impacts, controversies, and legal action

Before construction began on Tellico Dam, the Tennessee Fish and Game Commission addressed concerns to TVA personnel that the construction of Tellico Dam would bring the demise of trout fishing on the Little Tennessee. 

TVA attempted to control and defuse local controversy regarding the Tellico Project with the formation of local group known as the Little Tennessee River Valley Development Association (LTRVDA) in 1963. However, within a year, the LTRVDA was unable to control local opposition. Citing the loss of prime farmland, in December 1964 the Tennessee Farm Bureau Association passed resolutions protesting the completion of Tellico Dam. One year later, delegates from the Cherokee Nation filed a petition protesting the desecration of their ancestral lands that were proposed to be flooded for the Tellico Dam. This petition was sent to the office of Supreme Court Associate Justice William O. Douglas, who forwarded the petition to President Lyndon B. Johnson.

In 1971, University of Tennessee (UT) economics professor Keith Phillips criticized TVA's plans for Tellico Dam in a reappraisal of the project. Phillips found fault with the cost and benefits evaluation conducted by the TVA, and suggested that the agency's officials on the project were technically incompetent.

Following continued press of TVA's excessive and "abusive" power regarding the agency's property acquisition methods for the Tellico Project, Republican Governor Winfield Dunn wrote in a 1971 letter of dissent to TVA chair Wagner to stop construction of Tellico Dam, stating that the TVA should recognize "that the Little Tennessee as it now exists is a waterway too valuable for the State of Tennessee to sacrifice." TVA rejected Dunn's request in a letter of response one year later.

Finding an opportunity, Little Tennessee Valley farmers and environmentalists formed a joint activist group known as the Environmental Defense Fund (EDF) in 1972. The EDF brought suit against TVA under National Environmental Policy Act (NEPA), claiming that no environmental impact statement (EIS) had been made, violating the NEPA. In court, TVA personnel presented an EIS completed prior to the lawsuit by the EDF. The case was dismissed, allowing construction to continue without disruption.

Discovery of the snail darter 

On August 12, 1973, a group of students led by UT biology professor David Etnier conducted a study for possible endangered species via snorkeling in the Little Tennessee River during construction operations on Tellico Dam. Prior to the expedition, Etnier predicted up to ten endangered species occupied the proposed Tellico basin. In the Coytee Springs shoal area of the Little Tennessee, Etnier identified several snail darters, to which in a later interview with the Knoxville News Sentinel suggested he "knew nobody had ever seen it before." Four months later, the Nixon administration passed the Endangered Species Act of 1973 (ESA), providing federal protection for endangered species from potential habitat destructions. By this point, the dam was well under construction and already over US$53 million (equivalent to $ in ) had been spent on the construction work, requiring an injunction to stop the building from continuing and the flooding to happen. On November 10, 1975, the snail darter was placed on the Endangered Species list by the U.S. Fish and Wildlife Service.

Litigation to protect the snail darter 

Seeking to protect the snail darter, UT law student Hiram "Hank" Hill, in collaboration with David Etnier, filed the case Tennessee Valley Authority v. Hill, 437 U.S. 153 in federal court, citing that the TVA was in violation of the ESA. District Court Judge Robert Taylor declined an injunction against closure of construction of Tellico Dam on May 25, 1976.

On January 31, 1977, construction on Tellico Dam was ordered to stop, following a permanent higher injunction from the United States Court of Appeals for the Sixth Circuit in its review of Tennessee Valley Authority v. Hill. The TVA petitioned to the U.S. Fish and Wildlife Service to remove the snail darter as an endangered species on February 28. The FWS denied this request in December. On behalf of the TVA, the United States Department of Justice filed an appeal to the decision by the 6th Circuit regarding Tennessee Valley Authority v. Hill on January 25, 1978, to the Supreme Court of the United States. In Hill, the Supreme Court affirmed, by a 6-3 vote, an injunction issued by the 6th Circuit Appeals Court to stop construction of the dam. Citing explicit wording of the Endangered Species Act (ESA) to ensure that habitat for listed species is not disrupted, the Court said "it is clear that the TVA's proposed operation of the dam will have precisely the opposite effect, namely the eradication of an endangered species."

Aftermath of Supreme Court decision 

In the ensuing controversy over the snail darter, the Endangered Species Committee (also known as the "God Squad") was convened to issue a waiver of ESA protection of the snail darter. In a unanimous decision, the Committee refused to exempt the Tellico Dam project. Charles Schultze, the chairman of the President's Council of Economic Advisers, later cited economic assessments concluding that, despite the Tellico Dam being 95% complete, "if one takes just the cost of finishing it against the benefits and does it properly, it doesn't pay, which says something about the original design." Following publication of a story by The New York Times (NYT) regarding the death of nearly 100 snail darters during a October 1977 translocation operation, the TVA Director of Information John Van went on damage control in a subsequent NYT editorial, directing the blame towards the lack of adequate netting by the United States Fish and Wildlife Service.

Tellico Dam exempted from ESA 
After a long battle, Congress exempted the Tellico Dam from the Endangered Species Act by passing an amendment in a seemingly unrelated bill. On September 25, 1979, President Jimmy Carter signed the bill exempting the Tellico project from the ESA. Carter had publicly opposed the completion of the dam, but administration officials speculated that an attempt to veto the bill would result in retaliation against Carter's plans for revising treaties for the Panama Canal and the establishment of a federal department for educational affairs, two issues the Carter administration prioritized for passing.

Flooding of Cherokee land 

In 1979, three Cherokee individuals and two Cherokee bands/organizations filed suit against the TVA to restrain the flooding of sacred homeland in Sequoyah v. Tennessee Valley Authority, to no avail. Archeological surveys and salvage excavations were conducted in some areas because this area was known to have contained numerous 18th-century Overhill Cherokee towns. But the sites of Chota, Tanasi, Toqua, Tomotley, Citico, Mialoquo and Tuskegee were all flooded by the reservoir behind the dam. Some of these had been occupied by ancestors of the Cherokee for up to 1,000 years, based on the earthwork platform mounds built at their centers by people of the South Appalachian Mississippian culture. In their succeeding long occupancy, the Cherokee had built councilhouses on top of the mounds. In addition, other prehistoric sites, dating to as early as the Archaic period, were flooded.

Other impacts 
The contemporary port of Morganton was submerged by the Tellico lake.

Translocation of snail darters 
Remnant populations of the snail darter were later removed from the Little Tennessee River and translocated into other streams. In total, 219 snail darters were removed from the Tellico basin. Most of these were transferred to the Hiwassee River in Polk County in southeast Tennessee, which established a base habitat in the river by 1982. The Holston, French Broad, Nolichucky rivers of central East Tennessee also have been established as habitats for the snail darter.

Completion and recent history
The Tellico lake began to form on November 29, 1979, after the gates were closed on the dam. 

Still intent on development projects to improve the economic conditions of the Little Tennessee Valley, the TVA began sales on lakefront acreage that the agency seized through eminent domain. Many landowners whose property was seized by TVA were unable to qualify to bid on their former lands. 

In April 1982, the Tellico Reservoir Development Agency (TRDA) was established by the Tennessee state legislature with state and TVA funding, to promote economic development initiatives in the Tellico region. The TRDA assisted in the creation of several industrial parks for industrial and corporate investment to reduce the unemployment rate in the area. In September of the same year, the TVA suggested constructing toxic waste dumps on Tellico-acquired sites. One of these sites known as the Tellico Peninsula, was billed as the prime spot on the Tellico site for economic development. Despite attempts, the Tellico Peninsula site has remained undeveloped since site work was completed in the 1980s, aside from a Christensen Shipyards facility which closed following the Great Recession. In 2017, proposals were announced for the site to be redeveloped into a mixed-use town center community.

Resort development

The residential component of the failed Timberlake project underwent a rebirth with the purchase in late 1984 of more than  along the western shore of the Tellico Reservoir by Cooper Communities Inc. (CCI), a private real estate firm based out of Bella Vista, Arkansas. This development became a planned retirement community known as Tellico Village that opened in March 1987. CCI promoted Tellico Village and the Tellico Reservoir at golf and boat shows across the Midwestern United States. Since the development of Tellico Village, the Tellico area has drawn retirees from the Midwest and from Florida, initiating a retirement-oriented real estate boom.

By the late 1990s and into the 2000s, the TVA was pressured by private development groups to release additional acreage that had been seized via eminent domain along the agency's several reservoirs. The intention was for further development, predominantly golf course-based residential resorts. In 1995, a 960-acre community known as Rarity Bay was constructed, with an equestrian center and golf course. Mike Ross, the developer behind Rarity Bay built several resort developments on TVA reservoirs before being charged in federal court with mail fraud and money laundering in 2012. The TVA board approved the sale of preserved land on the eastern shore of Tellico Reservoir for a $750 million golf-course community known as Rarity Pointe in 2002. In 2012, Rarity Pointe was purchased by WindRiver Management LLC, which brought expansion of the site and the renaming of the community from Rarity Pointe to WindRiver.

Snail darter post-Tellico
The snail darter was removed from the Endangered Species list by the U.S. Fish & Wildlife Service on August 6, 1983. The fish was still classified as a threatened species because the Hiwassee River, where the snail darters from the Little Tennessee had been translocated, had a history of acid spills from freight accidents. By 2021, the snail darter was removed as a threatened species, with the U.S. Fish and Wildlife Service reporting the snail darter population had recovered from any risk of endangerment.

Impacts on dam-building and TVA
The completion of the Tellico Project marked the end of dam-building by the TVA, as it remains the last dam to be built by the TVA as of 2022. Until the events of the Tellico Project, the value of building a dam was rarely questioned; dams were widely considered to represent progress and technological prowess. Throughout the 20th-century, the United States had built thousands of dams, often to generate hydroelectric power and provide flood control. By the 1950s, most of the best potential dam sites in the United States had been used, and it became increasingly difficult to justify new dams. Government agencies such as TVA, the Bureau of Reclamation, and the Army Corps of Engineers continued to construct new dams, often at the behest of congressional representatives of related areas such as in the case of Tellico. In the 1970s, the era of dam-building ended with the Tellico Dam case illustrating the United States' changing attitudes. From 1933 with the beginning of the pivotal Norris Project to the end of Tellico in 1979, the TVA had forcibly removed more than 125,000 residents of the Tennessee Valley. This removal of people remains a controversial talking point on the methods and merit behind the TVA's dam projects. In the 1980s, the TVA attempted the construction of a $83 million dam intent on tourism and economic development similar to Tellico on the Duck River near Columbia, Tennessee, but resulted in failure and the 1999 demolition of the unfinished dam following environmental and financial consequences raised during the project. In 2001, the 13,000-acre area for the project, known as the Columbia Project, was transferred for public use to the state of Tennessee.

See also
Bussell Island
National Register of Historic Places listings in Loudon County, Tennessee

References

External links

Tellico Reservoir — TVA site
Tellico Reservoir — Tennessee Wildlife Resources Agency

Dams on the Little Tennessee River
Buildings and structures in Loudon County, Tennessee
Dams in Tennessee
Tennessee Valley Authority dams
Dams completed in 1979
Historic districts in Tennessee
National Register of Historic Places in Loudon County, Tennessee
Dams on the National Register of Historic Places in Tennessee
United States environmental case law
Controversies in the United States
Eminent domain
Cherokee towns
Appalachian studies
United States land use case law
Dam controversies